Azreh may refer to:
 Azreh-ye Mohammad Khan
 Azreh-ye Mokarrami